The rue de la Paix (English: Peace Street) is a fashionable shopping street in the center of Paris.  Located in the 2nd arrondissement of Paris, running north from Place Vendôme and ending at the Opéra Garnier, it is best known for its jewellers, such as the shop opened by Cartier in 1898. Charles Frederick Worth was the first to open a couture house in the rue de la Paix. Many buildings on the street are inspired in design by the hôtels particuliers of Place Vendôme.

History

The street was opened in 1806 from Place Vendôme on the orders of Napoleon I, part of the Napoleonic program to open the heart of the Right Bank of Paris, both towards the undeveloped western suburbs and to the north. Creating the new street required the demolition of the ancient Convent of the Capucins. 
At first named rue Napoléon, its name was changed in 1814, after the Bourbon Restoration, to celebrate the newly arranged peace.

During the Paris Commune, the street saw a demonstration protesting against the commune government. On 22 March 1871, National Guard soldiers, who were commanded by Jules Bergeret, after being fired upon, fired into a crowd of mostly unarmed marchers that were heading to the Place Vendôme. The resulting bloodshed saw 12 protestors killed and a soldier. The event has been termed the Massacre in the Rue de la Paix. It was the first act of violence against the Parisian citizens since the siege of Paris ended two months before.

Transportation
Based in the center of Paris, the street can be reached by:
 metro: line 1 
 or buses: 72.

Retail outlets associated with rue de la Paix
 Boué Soeurs, a fashion house active from the late 1890s to early 1950s. 
 Cartier - 1898.
 Charles Frederick Worth was the first to open a couture house at 7 rue de la Paix, and in 1885 created the label of his salon "Worth 7, Rue de la Paix".
 Duvelleroy is a fan-maker house established at 15 rue de la Paix in 1827 by Jean-Pierre Duvelleroy,.
 Louis Aucoc - The Aucoc family firm at 6 rue de la Paix was established in 1821.
 Maison Maquet, a luxury stationery and leather goods manufacturer, was located at No. 20 from 1841 to 1846, then at No. 24 from 1847 to 1867, and finally at No. 10 from 1868, where it remained for about a century. 

In 1847 all even numbers in Rue de la Paix south of the junction with rue Daunou changed up by two following the redevelopment of number 4 into two units, becoming 4 and 6. Due to the anomaly of being two number 14’s on the corners either side of rue Daunou the numbers north of this road were increased by four. Therefore Maison Maguet didn’t physically move location, it was just their street number within the address that changed. The famous jeweller and clockmaker Athanase Bourdin had his shop at no.24, as a part of the Hotel Canterbury, with the number of both changing to 28 in 1847 although neither moved location. Number 28 was demolished in 1868 to make way for the new boulevard fronting the Opera House.
Prior to 1847 Louis Aucoc had their address as Rue de la Paix 4, only becoming 6 after this date.

Rue de la Paix in popular culture
The rue de la Paix is the most expensive property in the French version of Monopoly - the equivalent to "Boardwalk" in the American version, or "Mayfair" in the UK version. 
Due to this, the rue de la Paix is referenced by French singer Zazie in her song of the same name, in which she compares societies based on consumerism to a game of Monopoly.
Rue de la Paix is mentioned by Rhett Butler in the novel Gone with the Wind by Margaret Mitchell as the source of the green bonnet purchased to bring Scarlett O'Hara out of mourning.
One of the villains in Where in Time Is Carmen Sandiego? is named "Rudy Lepay".
Also mentioned in the Noël Coward song: "Parisian Pierrot" (recorded 1936); "...The Rue de la Paix is under your sway..."
Also mentioned in the Leonard Gershe Rodger Edens song: "Bonjour Paris" featured in the 1957 film Funny Face

References

Shopping districts and streets in France
Paix, Rue de la
Jewellery districts